Bemersyde House is a historic house in Roxburghshire, Scotland.

The nearest towns are Newtown St. Boswells, Melrose, and Dryburgh. The William Wallace Statue, Bemersyde is on the Bemersyde Estate.

History

Dating back to the 16th century as a peel tower, Bemersyde was bought by the British Government in 1921 and presented to Field-Marshal The 1st Earl Haig, the British Commander in World War I. The House is the seat of the chief of Clan Haig, currently Alexander Douglas Derrick Haig, 3rd Earl Haig. The family motto of the Earls Haig is "Tyde what may", which refers to a 13th-century poem by Thomas the Rhymer which predicted that there would always be a Haig in Bemersyde:

See also
Bemersyde, Bemersyde Moss
List of places in the Scottish Borders
List of places in Scotland

References

External links
RCAHMS/Canmore record for Bemersyde House, Outbuildings
RCAHMS record for Bemersyde House, Gardens
SCRAN image: Bemersyde, cast-iron fingerpost
Entry in the Gazetteer of Scotland
Picture and some details

Houses in the Scottish Borders
Category A listed buildings in the Scottish Borders
Inventory of Gardens and Designed Landscapes
Tower houses in Scotland